Nadjakov Glacier is the 5.5 km long and 2 km wide glacier on Arctowski Peninsula on Danco Coast in Graham Land on the Antarctic Peninsula.  Situated east of Wheatstone Glacier.  Draining north-northeastwards to enter the head of Beaupré Cove east of Stolze Peak.

The glacier is named after the Bulgarian physicist Georgi Nadjakov (1897–1981) who discovered the photoelectret state essential to modern photocopying.

Location
British mapping in 1980.

Maps
 British Antarctic Territory. Scale 1:200000 topographic map No. 3217. DOS 610 - W 64 62. Tolworth, UK, 1980.
 Antarctic Digital Database (ADD). Scale 1:250000 topographic map of Antarctica. Scientific Committee on Antarctic Research (SCAR). Since 1993, regularly upgraded and updated.

References
 Bulgarian Antarctic Gazetteer. Antarctic Place-names Commission. (details in Bulgarian, basic data in English)
 Nadjakov Glacier. SCAR Composite Antarctic Gazetteer

External links
 Nadjakov Glacier. Copernix satellite image

Bulgaria and the Antarctic
Glaciers of Danco Coast